Air chief marshal Sir Walter Lloyd Dawson,  (6 May 1902 – 10 June 1994) was a senior commander in the Royal Air Force in the 1950s. He was the last RAF commander in Palestine, before the creation of the State of Israel.

RAF career
Dawson joined the Royal Air Force as a boy mechanic in 1919. He served in the Second World War on the air staff at RAF Middle East and then in the Directorate of Plans at the Air Ministry. He continued his war service as Station Commander at RAF St Eval from 1942, Director of Operations (Naval Co-operation) from 1943 and Director of Plans from 1944. After the war he was made Air Officer Commanding AHQ Levant at a difficult time when the State of Israel was being established. He was appointed Commandant of the School of Land/Air Warfare in 1948 and then served as Senior RAF Instructor at the Imperial Defence College from 1950 before becoming Assistant Chief of the Air Staff (Policy) in 1952. He went on to be Deputy Chief of Staff for Plans & Policy at Headquarters Supreme Headquarters Allied Powers Europe in 1953, Inspector-General of the RAF in 1956 and Air Member for Supply and Organisation in 1958 before he retired in 1960.

He died on 10 June 1994. Dawson's Field in Jordan, where the Dawson's Field hijackings took place, is named after him.

References

|-

|-

|-

|-

1902 births
1994 deaths
Commanders of the Order of the British Empire
Companions of the Distinguished Service Order
Graduates of the Royal Air Force College Cranwell
Knights Commander of the Order of the Bath
Royal Air Force air marshals
Royal Air Force personnel of World War II